Salinimonas sediminis is a Gram-negative, rod-shaped slightly halophilic and piezophilic bacterium from the genus of Salinimonas which has been isolated from sediments from a deep of 4700 meter from the New Britain Trench.

References

Bacteria described in 2018
Alteromonadales